In English law, a qualifying floating charge is a floating charge which enables the holder to appoint an administrator or administrative receiver under the Insolvency Act 1986 without the need for an order of the court.  The change was introduced by the Enterprise Act 2002, and was designated to streamline the process in relation to the appointment of an administrators (all floating charges historically had the power to appoint an administrative receiver).

A floating charge is a qualifying floating charge if it is expressed to be one, or if the security document purports to give the holder power to appoint an administrator or administrative receiver.

The procedure for appointing an administrator under a qualifying floating charge is as follows:
 the floating charge holder has given at least two business days written notice to any holders of qualifying floating charges with priority over the applicant's (i.e. in that they were created before or take precedence by way of an agreement), and
 the relevant floating charge is enforceable (i.e. the holder is entitled to call in the security), and
 the company is neither in liquidation nor has a provisional liquidator been appointed, and
 neither an administrator nor an administrative receiver is already in office.

Subsequent to the appointment of an administrator under a qualifying floating charge, the holder of the floating charge must notify the court of the appointment.

References

Corporate finance
Property law